Maipady Venkatesh Varma Raja officially Ramantharasugal - XI, and popularly known as the Raja of Maipady and he was the last Monarch of the Principality of Kumble Seeme which roughly comprised the area of present Kasaragod taluk of Kasaragod district, Kerala, India and some neighbouring regions. He died on 10 June 1994. He was married to Karthyayini Kettilamma.

References

1994 deaths
Tulu people
20th-century Indian monarchs
People from Kasaragod district
Year of birth missing